Nobumitsu (written: 信光) is a masculine Japanese given name. Notable people with the name include:

, Japanese playwright
, Japanese samurai and writer
, Japanese golfer

Japanese masculine given names